ASL Airlines France, (ASLI) formerly Europe Airpost, is an airline based in Paris-Charles de Gaulle and operates out of major French airports. The airline operates both cargo and passenger flights with a fleet of B737 aircraft including the B737-300QC, the B737-700 passenger aircraft and both the B737-400F and -800BCF. ASLF operates freighter services on behalf of express freight integrators, including FedEx Express, and has been an operator of overnight postal flights for  La Poste. The airline also operates charter cargo flights.

The airline provides scheduled passenger services from domestic French airports to points in North Africa including Algeria. The airline also operates transatlantic passenger services, on behalf of Air Saint-Pierre to the French overseas territory of Saint Pierre and Miquelon, off the coast of Newfoundland, Canada. Additionally, ASL Airlines France operates charter passenger flights throughout Europe for leading European tour operators and brokers.

ASL Aviation Holdings DAC, the parent company of ASL Airlines Ireland, is headquartered in Swords, County Dublin, Ireland.

History 
The airline's roots can be traced to the "Companie générale aéropostale" in 1927 that pioneered mail delivery between Europe, Africa and South America with famous pilots like Jean Mermoz and Antoine de Saint-Exupéry. The company was dissolved in 1932 and was then merged with others to form Air France.  

The company was a subsidiary of Air France from 1947 to 1991, operating as Société d'Exploitation Aéropostale (SEA). It took on the name Europe Airpost in 2000 when it started services on its own for the French national postal service (La Poste). On March 14, 2008, ASL Aviation Holdings DAC officially acquired the airline. The aircraft kept the former livery and call sign. The company had 400 employees as of  March 2007.

On 4 June 2015, ASL Aviation Holdings DAC, the parent company of Europe Airpost, announced that Europe Airpost would be rebranded as ASL Airlines France.

Destinations

Fleet 

The ASL Airlines France fleet consists of the following aircraft (as of August 2019):

In June 2021, ASL Aviation Holdings announced an order with Boeing for up to 20 737-800 Boeing Converted Freighter (BCF) aircraft - 10 firm orders and 10 options at the Paris Air Show. This was extended to an additional 20 737-800 Boeing Converted Freighters (BCF) in March 2022.  ASL's order, including options brings the number of 737-800BCF to 40 aircraft. Eleven aircraft operate for ASL Airlines Belgium, ASL Airlines France, ASL Airlines Ireland and ASL joint venture, K-Mile Asia.

References

External links

Official website

Airlines of France
Airlines established in 2000
Charter airlines